Ganieve Kaur Majithia (born Ganieve Grewal) is an Indian politician and a member of 16th Punjab Legislative Assembly representing Majitha. She is a member of the Shiromani Akali Dal.

Personal life
Born as Ganieve Grewal, Majithia graduated from Jesus and Mary College, University of Delhi in 1996. She married politician Bikram Singh Majithia in November 2009, with whom she has two sons. She is a businessperson and agriculturalist by profession.

Political career
Majithia entered into politics in the 2022 Punjab Legislative Assembly election, as a successor of her husband from the Majitha constituency. She went on to defeat Aam Aadmi Party's Sukhjinder Singh Lalli Majithia by 26062 votes.

Electoral performance

References

1970s births
Living people
Shiromani Akali Dal politicians
Punjab, India MLAs 2022–2027
People from Amritsar district
Year of birth missing (living people)